Valentinos is a Greek male given name, equivalent to the English name Valentine.

People with this given name include:

 Valentinos Sielis (born 1990), Cypriot soccer player
 Valentinos Vlachos (born 1992), Greek soccer player

See also